Gualtiero Bassetti (born 7 April 1942) is an Italian prelate of the Catholic Church who was Archbishop of Perugia-Città della Pieve from 2009 to 2022. He has been a bishop since 1994 and was made a cardinal in 2014. He was president of the Italian Episcopal Conference from 2017 to 2022.

Priest

Gualtiero Bassetti was born on 7 April 1942 in Popolano di Marradi. He attended the minor and major seminary of the archdiocese of Florence and was ordained a priest on 29 June 1966 in Florence.  He served as vicar in the parish of St. Michael in San Salvi. In 1968 he became assistant at the minor seminary of Florence and then rector in 1972. Seven years later, he was subsequently appointed rector of the major seminary of Florence. He served there for 11 years and was then appointed pro-vicar and vicar general of the archdiocese.

Bishop and archbishop

On 9 July 1994 he was appointed bishop of Massa Marittima-Piombino and consecrated on 8 September 1994 by Cardinal Silvano Piovanelli, Archbishop of Florence. He was named bishop of Arezzo on 21 November 1998. He was named the archbishop of Perugia-Città della Pieve on 16 July 2009.

He was elected head of the Catholic Bishops Conference of Umbria in 2012 and was appointed deputy president of the Italian Episcopal Conference.

Cardinal

On 22 February 2014, Bassetti was raised to the rank of cardinal by Pope Francis. Bassetti commented in response: "My aims have not changed. I want to visit factories and hospitals, because as the Pope says, we must 'be pastors with the odor of sheep.' This is the time to roll our sleeves back." He also praised the Pope's nomination of Archbishop Loris Capovilla as "a direct reference the Second Vatican Council". La Stampa called it a "surprise nomination". It was the first time a bishop of Perugia had been named a cardinal since Gioacchino Pecci, later Pope Leo XIII, in 1853. His selection was seen, according to John L. Allen, as a demonstration of Francis' preference for "traditionally neglected locales" and for "political moderates". Another observer described him as "instantly papabile, a man cut from the same cloth as Francis". Giovanni Paciullo, Rector of the University for Foreign Students of Perugia, called the nomination a tribute to Bassetti's "constant concern for the least, the excluded, the foreigner ... which brought him into the paths of marginalization and suffering..."

Bassetti has celebrated Mass in Latin using the Missal promulgated by Pope John XXIII in 1962 and delivered homilies at such liturgies. Pope Francis named him a member of Congregation for Bishops, Congregation for the Clergy, and Pontifical Council for Promoting Christian Unity.

In 2016 at the request of Pope Francis he authored the meditations for the Good Friday Way of the Cross service at the Colosseum.

On 23 May 2017, Pope Francis named Bassetti to a five-year term as head of the Italian Episcopal Conference (CEI). Bassetti's name was one of three presented to the Pope by the Conference membership and the one who had received the most votes from them. At the same time he extended Bassetti's appointment as Archbishop of Perugia for five years despite the fact that Bassetti had submitted his resignation as required on his 75th birthday a few weeks earlier. Opening the CEI's annual meeting on 25 September, Bassetti called for collegiality and dialogue between bishops and with the entire Church. He said he planned to end the practice of beginning the annual meeting with the president's address and would instead conclude the meeting by summarizing their debate and "seeking a point of equilibrium". As a starting point, he said Catholics could not be divided into those who prioritize personal morality and those who advocate for social justice. He spoke of the need to integrate migrants into Italian society, implying support for citizenship for those born in Italy. A reform of the tax system, he said, could support families, especially large ones, promote childbirth and provide employment.

Pope Francis named him a member of the Congregation for the Oriental Churches on 6 August 2019.

According to Vatican journalist Sandro Magister, Bassetti was resistant to Pope Francis's desire to convene a synod of the Church in Italy, leading to tension with the pope.

Pope Francis accepted his resignation as archbishop of Perugia on 27 May 2022.

Health
After experiencing a fever, Bassetti tested positive for COVID-19 on 28 October 2020. He was admitted to Santa Maria della Misericordia Hospital in Perugia on 31 October, and was in the intensive care unit from the night of 2-3 November until 13 November; his condition remained critical. On 19 November he was transferred to Rome's Agostino Gemelli University Policlinic to continue his convalescence.

See also
Cardinals created by Francis

References

External links

 
  
 Christmas sermon, 2013.

 

|-
 

|-

|-

|-

1942 births
Living people
People from Marradi
Roman Catholic archbishops in Italy
Bishops of Massa
Bishops of Arezzo
Bishops in Umbria
Cardinals created by Pope Francis
21st-century Italian cardinals
Members of the Congregation for Bishops
Members of the Congregation for the Clergy
Members of the Pontifical Council for Promoting Christian Unity
21st-century Italian Roman Catholic archbishops